New Aeon may refer to:
Aeon of Horus in Thelema
Messianic Age, in Abrahamic religions
new Aeon, an album by Yae Fujimoto
New Age